Dreamlin is an electronic music group from Belarus. 
Dreamlin, hailing from Minsk, Belarus started when Denis «C4» Korabkov, who used to play guitar with a local cult, psychedelic reggae band at the time met Egor Kunovsky, who had long been involved with music software and computers.

In 2000, they teamed together as Dreamlin. In 2002 they started playing to live crowds. By 2004 Egor plays most of the gigs together with multyinstrumentalist Andrey Karpovich (Andre Karp), while Denis prefers studio work, now not only with Dreamlin project. The style of the music that Dreamlin produces is not limited to a genre or two. The first album, The Colour Of The City was released in 2004 in Belarus, in 2005 in Russia and 2006 saw it available on digital download sites worldwide. It was later removed from sale as  Collaps closed and re-released again in 2013.

In 2006 Dreamlin was first invited to play a gig outside of ex-USSR. In 2007 Andrey has left the country and returned only in 2009 when the band finally started to make songs with Andrey's vocals. The second standalone release of music by Dreamlin is the Monday Islands EP released in 2008 as digital download. "Let's" EP was released in 2011 and featured music that would be most likely interesting to Russian-speaking audience. Next official album is "Let me know" released in 2016. Latest is "Evergreen", released on 4/04/2019

External links
 Dreamlin - chill out from Belarus - official website
 

Belarusian electronic music groups
Electronica musicians
Belarusian music